Nicholas Mountain, or Irons Mountain, is located in Allegany County, Maryland, United States and extends northeasterly from the North Branch Potomac River for  until  southeast of Cumberland, Maryland.

References 
 United States Geological Survey
 Maryland Geological survey

Landforms of Allegany County, Maryland
Mountains of Maryland